Antica may refer to:

 Ostia Antica, an archaeological site that is the location of the harbour city of ancient Rome
 Via Appia Antica (Appian Way), one of the earliest and strategically most important Roman roads of the ancient republic
 Carpano Antica Formula, a brand of sweet vermouth
 A fictional location in the Star Trek episode Lonely Among Us